Barnfield is a suburb of Luton, in the Luton district, in the ceremonial county of Bedfordshire, England. The area is roughly bounded by Old Bedford Road/Cromer Way roundabout to the north, Wardown Park and Wardown Crescent to the south, the A6 to the west, and Old Bedford Road, Elmwood Crescent and Wardown Crescent to the east.

Local area 
The area is home to Barnfield College, a vocational college and Luton Sixth Form College, a sixth form. The area consists largely of mature semi-detached and detached houses located around Old Bedford Road.

The area itself is mainly built up residential, but the River Lea runs through and there is a green space surrounding the path of the river.

Politics

Barnfield is part of the larger Barnfield ward, which also includes Bushmead. The ward is represented by Cllr David Franks (Liberal Democrats) and Cllr Amjid Ali (Liberal Democrats).
The ward forms part of the parliamentary constituency of Luton North, and the MP is Sarah Owen (Labour).

Local attractions

Local newspapers
Two weekly newspapers cover Barnfield, although they are not specific to the area.

They are the:
 Herald and Post
 Luton News

References

External links

 Luton Borough Council

Areas of Luton
Wards of Luton